Nemotelus nudus is a species of soldier fly in the family Stratiomyidae.

Distribution
Colombia, Brazil.

References

Stratiomyidae
Insects described in 1914
Diptera of South America
Invertebrates of Colombia
Fauna of Brazil
Taxa named by Kálmán Kertész